Isaac was the Archdeacon of Barnstaple until 1227.

References

Archdeacons of Barnstaple